This is a list of films and TV series set in Palm Springs, California. It covers topical settings and storyline subjects set in Palm Springs and other nearby resort communities of the Coachella Valley. These communities, which include Palm Springs, Bermuda Dunes, Cathedral City, Coachella, Desert Hot Springs, Indian Wells, Indio, La Quinta, Mecca, Palm Desert, Rancho Mirage, and the Salton Sea, are in Riverside County, southern California. Included are individual episodes of TV series.

Films

1930s

 Lucky Dog – 1933 film
 Palm Springs (a.k.a. Palm Springs Affair) – 1936 film
 Screen Snapshots – 1924–1958 short films
 Series 15, No. 7 (1936)
 Series 16, No. 6 (1937)
 Series 17, No. 5 (1938)
 Sunkist Stars at Palm Springs – 1936 film
 Three Wise Guys – 1936 film

1940s

 Flight to Nowhere – 1946 film
 The Glass Alibi – 1946 film
 Hedda Hopper's Hollywood – 1941–1942 short subjects
 High Sierra – 1941 film
 Hollywood Newsreel – 1946 film (episode: "Hollywood Stars and the Palm Springs Parade")
 Passkey to Danger – 1946 film
 The Saint in Palm Springs – 1941 film
 Yokel Boy – 1942 film

1950s

 711 Ocean Drive – 1950 film
 The Big Bluff – 1955 film
 D.O.A. – 1950 film
 Drive a Crooked Road – 1954 film
 Jet Pilot – 1957 film
 Mr. Imperium – 1951 film
 Star Studded Ride – 1954 short film
 The Monster That Challenged the World – 1957 film

1960s

 The Cool Ones – 1967 film
 Eegah (a.k.a. Eegah! The Name Written in Blood) – 1962 film
 Happy – 1960–1961 television series
 Looney Tunes – 1930–1969 cartoon series
 The Abominable Snow Rabbit (1961)
 Music Mice-tro (1967)
 Palm Springs Weekend – 1963 film
 The Restless Ones – 1965 film
 Strangers When We Meet – 1960 film

1970s
 Kotch – 1971 film

1980s

 Less than Zero – ending scenes of the 1987 film based on the novel by Bret Easton Ellis
 Daffy Duck's Quackbusters – 1988 film
 Fraternity Vacation – 1985 film
 A Masterpiece of Murder – 1986 film
 Pee-wee's Big Adventure – 1985 comedy (scenes at the Cabazon Dinosaurs near Cabazon)
 Rockin' the Night Away – 1988 music DVD
 Screenplay – 1984 gay pornographic video
 Slow Burn – 1986 TV film

1990s

 After Dark, My Sweet – 1990 film
 Betty – 1997 film
 Camp Fear – 1991 direct-to-video film
 City of Industry – 1997 film
 Dead Silence (a.k.a. A Death in Palm Springs) – 1997 film
 Fugitive Nights: Danger in the Desert – 1993 film
 Grace of My Heart – 1996 film
 I'll Love You Forever ... Tonight – 1992 film
 Mirage – 1995 film
 Play Time – 1995 film
 Poodle Springs – 1998 film
 The Rat Pack – 1998 TV film
 Round Trip to Heaven – 1992 film
 Still Kicking: The Fabulous Palm Springs Follies – 1997 short documentary film

2000s

 Alpha Dog – 2007 film
 The Aviator – 2004 film
 Bonneville – 2006 film
 Bounce – 2000 film
 Cat City – 2009 film
 Circuit – 2001 film
 Coachella: The Film – 2006 documentary about the Coachella Valley Music and Arts Festival in Indio
 Dog Tags – 2008 film
 The Eyes of Tammy Faye – 2000 documentary
 Fuel – 2008 film (documentary)
 Gay Getaways (episodes 1–4: L.A. to Palm Springs) – 2007 DVD hosted by Greg Osborne
 Harley-Davidson: The Spirit of America – 2005 film (documentary)
 Home – 2009 film (documentary by Yann Arthus-Bertrand)
 Into the Wild – 2007 film
 Jerks – 2000 film
 Laughing Matters: The Men – 2008 DVD with Bruce Vilanch and Alec Mapa
 Party in Progress Vol. 2: Palm Springs – 2002 VHS
 Phat Girlz – 2006 film
 Plagues & Pleasures on the Salton Sea – 2004 documentary (Salton Sea)
 Raise Your Voice – 2004 film (Palm Desert)
 The Salton Sea – 2002 film (Mecca (Box Canyon and Painted Canyon) and the Salton Sea)
 Slumber Party – 2005 DVD
 Third World California – 2006 documentary (Lower Coachella Valley)
 Visual Acoustics: The Modernism of Julius Shulman – 2009 film
 When Boys Fly – 2002 documentary

2010s

 About Fifty – 2011 film
 Apocalypse, CA – 2011 film
 Bombay Beach – 2010 documentary (Bombay Beach, California)
 Desert Utopia: Mid-Century Architecture in Palm Springs – 2010/2011 documentary
 Eating Out 5: The Open Weekend – 2012 film
 Encore of Tony Duran – 2011 film
 Good Luck Charlie, It's Christmas! – 2011 film
 Joan Rivers: A Piece of Work – 2010 documentary
 Little Birds – 2012 film set in the Salton Sea
 Pink Squirrels – 2011 film

2020s

 Palm Springs – 2020 film

Television and radio

1940s
 Abbott and Costello
 "Trip to Palm Springs" (radio) – December 2, 1943
 The Jack Benny Program (also broadcast as The Jack Benny Show) – 1932–1965 radio and TV series
 "Climb to Taquitz Falls" (radio) – March 2, 1941
 "Murder at the Racquet Club" (radio) – March 9, 1941 (with Charles Farrell and Charles Butterworth)
 "Palm Springs' Prices" (radio) – March 16, 1941
 "Going After Rommel" (radio) – November 29, 1942, with the 21st Ferrying Command.
 "From Torney Hospital in Palm Springs" (radio) – April 8, 1945 (with William Powell)
 "Desert Sketch" (radio) – April 22, 1945 (from the 29 Palms Naval Air Station)
 "From Palm Springs California" (radio) – February 10, 1946 (with Eddie Cantor)
 "Palm Springs Shopping" (radio) – February 24, 1946 (with Gilbert Seides)
 "From Palm Springs California" (radio) – February 22, 1948 (with Frank Sinatra)
 "From Palm Springs California" (radio) – April 11, 1948 (with Charles Farrell and Paul Lukas)
 "Murder at the Racquet Club" (radio) – April 19, 1948

1950s

 The Bob Cummings Show – 1955–1959 TV series
 Season 4, Episode 32, "Grandpa's Old Buddy" (1958)
 The Bob Hope Show (radio) – March 11, 1952
 The Charles Farrell Show – 1956 TV series
 Date with the Angels – 1956–1957 TV series
 Season 1, Episode 8, "Little White Lie" (1957)
 The Frank Sinatra Timex Show – 1957–1960 TV series
 Season 2, Episode 2, "You're invited to spend the afternoon at the Frank Sinatra Show" (1959)
 General Electric Theater – 1953–1962 TV series
 Season 3, Episode 30, "Into the Night" (1955)
 The George Burns and Gracie Allen Show – 1950–1958 TV series
 Season 1, Episode 9, "To Go or Not to Go" (a.k.a. "Live Show #9") (1951)
 Season 2, Episode 12, "Trip to Palm Springs" (1952)
 Season 3, Episode 25, "Gracie Reports Car Stolen" (1953)
 Season 7, Episode 21, "Going to Palm Springs" (1957)
 I Love Lucy – 1951–1957 TV series
 Season 4, Episode 26, "In Palm Springs" (1955)
 It's a Great Life – 1954–1956 TV series
 Season 2, Episode 33, "The Palm Springs Story" (1956)
 The Jack Benny Program (also broadcast as The Jack Benny Show) – 1932–1965 radio and TV series
 "From Palm Springs California" (radio) – March 26, 1950 (with Bob Hope and The Guadalajara Trio)
 "From Palm Springs California" (radio) – April 2, 1950 (with Al Jolson and Connie Barlow)
 "How Palm Springs Was Founded" (radio) – February 11, 1951 (at the American Legion Hall)
 "Palm Springs Murder Mystery" (radio – AFRS rebroadcast) – December 9, 1951
 "Jack Renews His Driver's License" (radio) – December 16, 1951
 "Palm Springs Steak Ride" (radio) – February 8, 1953
 "How Palm Springs Was Founded" (radio) – March 15, 1953 (included Mel Blanc's Mexican gag)
 "Steak Ride in Desert" (radio – AFRS rebroadcast) – May 24, 1953
 "Golf Game – Discovery of Palm Springs" (radio – AFRS rebroadcast) – June 29, 1953
 "To Palm Springs without Polly" (radio) – December 6, 1953
 "Christmas Show from Palm Springs" (radio) – December 13, 1953
 "Preparing for Palm Springs Vacation" (radio – AFRS rebroadcast) – May 10, 1954
 "Preparing for Palm Springs" (also titled "In Palm Springs") (radio) – December 12, 1954
 "Christmas at Palm Springs" (radio) – December 19, 1954
 Season 6, Episode 13, "Jack Drives To Palm Springs" (1956)
 The People's Choice – 1955–1958 TV series
 Season 2, Episode 16, "Sock's Master Plan" (1957)
 Person to Person – 1953–1961 TV series
 Season 5, Episode 17, (January 3, 1958)
 The Phil Silvers Show – 1955–1959 TV series
 Season 2, Episode 34, "The Colonel Breaks Par" (1957)
 Studio 57 – 1954–1956 TV series
 Season 3, Episode 6, "Palm Springs Incident" (1956)

1960s

 The Andy Williams Show – 1959–1971 TV series
 Season 4, Episode 19, (March 21, 1966)
 The Beverly Hillbillies – 1962–1971 TV series
 Season 1, Episode 4, "The Clampetts Meet Mrs. Drysdale" (1962)
 Good Morning World – 1967–1968 TV series
 Season 1, Episode 10, "Feet of Clay and a Head to Match" (1967)
 Season 1, Episode 17, "First Down and 200 Miles to Go" (1968)
 Happy – 1960–1961 TV series
 I Spy – 1965–1968 TV series
 Season 2, Episode 1, "So Coldly Sweet" (1966)
 Season 2, Episode 8, "Will the Real Good Guys Please Stand Up?" (1966)
 The Jack Benny Program (also broadcast as The Jack Benny Show) – 1932–1965 radio and TV series
 Season 15, Episode 21, "Rainy Day in Palm Springs" (1965)
 The Lucy Show – 1962–1968 TV series
 Season 5, Episode 8, "Lucy and Carol [Burnett] in Palm Springs" (1966)
 Mannix – 1967–1975 TV series
 Season 1, Episode 1, "The Name is Mannix" (1967)
 Mayberry R.F.D. – 1968–1971 TV series
 Season 2, Episode 10, "Palm Springs, Here We Come" (1969)
 Season 2, Episode 11, "Palm Springs, Here We Are" (1969)
 Season 2, Episode 12, "Millie and the Palm Springs Golf Pro" (1969)
 Season 2, Episode 13, "Palm Springs Cowboy" (1969)
 The Merv Griffin Show – 1962–1963, 1965–1986 TV series
 Season 4, Episode 169, (April 27, 1967)
 Season 4, Episode 170, (April 28, 1968)
 My Favorite Martian – 1963–1966 TV series
 Season 2, Episode 29, "Uncle Martin's Bedtime Story" (1965)
 Pete and Gladys – 1960–1962 TV series
 Season 1, Episode 14, "Misplaced Weekend" (1960)
 The Rocky and Bullwinkle Show – 1959–1964 animated cartoon series

1970s

 City of Angels – 1976 TV series
 Season 1, Episode 7, "Palm Springs Answer" (1976)
 Here's Lucy – 1968–1974 TV series
 Season 3, Episode 17, "Lucy's Vacation" (1971)
 Lou Grant – 1977–1982 TV series
 Season 2, Episode 20, "Convention" (1979)

1980s

 It's a Living – 1980–1982 and 1985–1989) TV series
 Season 4, Episode 10, "Critic's Choice" (1986)
 L.A. Law – 1986–1994 TV series
 Season 2, Episode 9, "Divorce with Extreme Prejudice" (1987)
 Season 5, Episode 18, "As God Is My Co-Defendant" (1991)
 Season 6, Episode 19, "Silence of the Lambskins" (1992)
 Murder, She Wrote – 1984–1996 TV series
 Season 6, Episode 4, "The Error of Her Ways" (1989)
 Too Close for Comfort – 1980–1986 TV series
 Season 5, Episode 8, "The Two Faces of Muriel" (1985)
 The Tracey Ullman Show – 1987–1990 TV series
 Season 3, Episode 20, "D.U.I." (1989)

1990s

 Behind the Music – 1997– TV documentary series
 Season 1, Episode 14, "Sonny Bono" (1998)
 Beverly Hills, 90210 – 1990–2000 TV series
 Season 1, Episode 11, "B.Y.O.B." (1991)
 Season 1, Episode 15, "A Fling in Palm Springs" (1991)
 Season 4, Episode 21, "Addicted to Love" (1994)
 Season 5, Episode 31, "P.S. I Love You: Part 1" (1994)
 Season 5, Episode 32, "P.S. I Love You: Part 2" (1994)
 Season 6, Episode 19, "Nancy's Choice" (1996)
 Season 7, Episode 21, "Straight Shooter" (1997)
 California's Gold – 1990– TV series with Huell Howser Productions in association with KCET/Los Angeles
 207 "Preserving the Past" (1991) (featuring bird songs of the Cahuilla people
 Season 7, Episode 4, "Mt. San Jacinto"
 Comic Strip Live – 1989–1994 TV series
 Season 1, Episode 7, "Palm Springs" (1991)
 Doogie Howser, M.D. – 1989–1993 TV series
 Season 1, Episode 10, "My Old Man and the Sea" (1989)
 Season 3, Episode 22, "Son of the Desert" (1992)
 The Fresh Prince of Bel-Air – 1990–1996 TV series
 Season 1, Episode 6, "Mistaken Identity" (1990)
 Good Morning America – 1975– TV series
 Season 18, Episode 223, (November 11, 1992)
 Hot Springs Hotel – 1997 Showtime adult comedy series (Desert Hot Springs)
 Kate Clinton: The Queen of Comedy – 1996 VHS taped at The Girl Bar during the Club Skirts Dinah Shore Weekend, included Maggie Cassella
 L.A. Doctors – 1998–1999 TV series
 Season 1, Episode 24, "Forty-Eight Minutes" (1999)
 Lea DeLaria: The Queen of Comedy – 1997 VHS taped at The Girl Bar during the 7th Club Skirts Dinah Shore Weekend
 Melrose Place – 1992–1999 TV series
 Season 1, Episode 30, "Carpe Diem" (1993)
 Season 4, Episode 16, "Holy Strokes" (1996)
 Season 5, Episode 28, "All Beths Are Off" (also called "Un-Janed Melody") (1997)
 P.S. I Luv U – 1991–1992 TV series
 Season 1, Episode 1, "Pilot" (1991)
 Season 1, Episode 2, "Smile, You're Dead" (1991)
 Season 1, Episode 3, "The Honeymooners" (1991)
 Season 1, Episode 4, "No Thanks for the Memories" (1991)
 Season 1, Episode 5, "Diamonds Are a Girl's Worst Friend" (1991)
 Season 1, Episode 6, "Unmarried... with Children" (1991)
 Season 1, Episode 7, "What's Up, Bugsy?" (1991)
 Season 1, Episode 8, "An Eye for an Eye" (1991)
 Season 1, Episode 9, "Where There's a Will, There's a Dani" (1991)
 Season 1, Episode 10, "I'd Kill to Direct" (1991)
 Season 1, Episode 11, "There Goes the Neighborhood" (1991)
 Season 1, Episode 12, "A Bundle of Trouble" (1992)
 Season 1, Episode 13, "The Chameleon" (1992)
 Rescue 911 – 1980–1996 TV series
 Season 6, Episode 18, "Chance Encounter" (1995)
 Saved by the Bell – 1989–1993 TV series
 Season 3, Episode 18, "Palm Springs Weekend: Part 1" (1991)
 Season 3, Episode 19, "Palm Springs Weekend: Part 2" (1991)
 Sonny Bono: Pop Songs & Politics – 1998 ABC News documentary

2000s

 $40 a Day – 2002–2005 TV series
 Season 2, Episode 15, "Palm Springs" (2003)
 90210 – 2008– TV series
 Season 1, Episode 13, "Love Me or Leave Me" (2009)
 America's Most Smartest Model – 2007 TV series
 Season 1, Episode 10, "Hit Me with Your Best Shot" (2007)
 Season 1, Episode 11, "Never Trust a Rottweiler" (2007)
 The Anna Nicole Show – 2002–2003 TV series
 Season 2, Episode 10, "Anna (Palm) Springs into Action" (a.k.a. "Gimme a Spring Break") (2003)
 Antiques Roadshow – 1997– TV series
 Season 13, Episode 1, "Palm Springs: Hour 1" (2009)
 Season 13, Episode 2, "Palm Springs: Hour 2" (2009)
 Season 13, Episode 3, "Palm Springs: Hour 3" (2009)
 Art Mann Presents – 2005– TV series
 Season 1, Episode 2, "Palm Springs/NBA All-Star Mayhem" (2009)
 The Bachelor – 2002– U.S. TV series
 Season 1, Episode 2, (2002)
 Season 14, Episode 2 (2010)
 Bam's Unholy Union – 2007 TV series
 Season 1, Episode 7, "Bam's Gone Wild" (2007)
 Season 1, Episode 12, "Palm Springs" (2003)
 Boy Meets Boy – 2003 TV series
 Season 1, Episode 1, "Boy Meets Boys and Overexuberant Host" (2003)
 Season 1, Episode 2, "Where Have All The Possibly Straight Cowboys Gone?" (2003)
 Season 1, Episode 3, "It's Raining Gay and Secretly Straight Men" (2003)
 Season 1, Episode 4, "Yeah, But Do You LIKE Me?" (2003)
 Season 1, Episode 5, "The Possibly Straight Cat's Out Of The Bag" (2003)
 Season 1, Episode 6, "Finale" (2003)
 Bump! – 2004– TV series
 Season 5, Episode 4, "Palm Springs" (2011)
 The Comeback – 2005 TV series
 Season 1, Episode 8, "Valerie Relaxes in Palm Springs" (2005)
 Cops – 1989– TV series
 Season 19, Episode 6, "Drug Arrests #2 Special Edition" (2006)
 Season 19, Episode 24, "Coast to Coast #15" (2007) 
 Destination Tennis – 2006– TV series
 Season 1, Episode 4, "Palm Springs" (2007)
 Dirty Jobs – 2003– TV series
 Season 3, Episode 28, "Aerial Tram Greaser" (2008)
 Season 6, Episode 13, "Date Palm Pollinator" (2010)
 Dweezil & Lisa – 2004 TV series
 Season 1, Episode 8, "Trip to L.A. and Palm Springs, CA" (2004)
 Eddie Griffin : Going for Broke – 2009 TV series
 Season 1, Episode 6, "Going For Broke" (2009)
 Eisenhower & Lutz – 1988 TV series
 Season 1, Episode 1, "The Whiplash Kid Returns (1)" (2008)
 Extreme Makeover: Home Edition – 2003–2012 TV series
 Season 3, Episode 15, "The De'Aeth Family" (2006)
 Family Guy – 1999– animated TV series
 Season 2, Episode 13, "Road to Rhode Island" (2000)
 Flavor of Love – 2006–2008 TV series
 Season 1, Episode 7, "Flav's Trippin'" (2006)
 Flipping Out – 2007– Bravo TV series
 Season 1, Episode 5, "The Inspector" (2007)
 Getaway – 1992– TV series
 Season 15, Episode 10, (2006)
 Haunted Hotels – 2001–2005 TV series
 Season 1, Episode 4, "Wandering Spirits" (2002)
 Hello Paradise – 2004– TV series
 81 episodes total (which include non-Palm Springs and desert episodes)
 Hidden Palms – 2007 TV series
 Season 1, Episode 1, "Pilot" (2007)
 Season 1, Episode 2, "Ghosts" (2007)
 Season 1, Episode 3, "Party Hardy" (2007)
 Season 1, Episode 4, "What Liza Beneath" (2007)
 Season 1, Episode 5, "Mulligan" (2007)
 Season 1, Episode 6, "Dangerous Liaisons" (2007)
 Season 1, Episode 7, "Stand By Your Woman" (2007)
 Season 1, Episode 8, "Second Chances" (2007)
 The Hills – 2006–2010 TV series
 Season 4, Episode 20, "I Heidi Take Thee Spencer..." (2008)
 House Hunters – 1999– TV series
 Season 15, Episode 1, "Palm Springs Dreamin'" (2005)
 Season 40, Episode 10, "Vacation Home in Palm Springs" (2010)
 Season 40, Episode 12, "Vacation Home in Palm Springs" (2010)
 Season 44, Episode 8, "Settling Down in Los Angeles" (2012)
 Season 74, Episode 9, "Couple Clashes Over Style in Palm Springs" (2013)
 Huff – 2004–2006 TV series
 Season 2, Episode 4, "Sweet Release" (2006)
 I Love New York – 2007–2008 TV series
 Season 1, Episode 8, "Gettin' Hot In The Desert" (2007)
 Intervention – 2005– TV series
 Season 1, Episode 4, "Alissa/Brian" (2005)
  The Janice Dickinson Modeling Agency – 2006–2008 TV series
 Season 1, Episode 6, "It's Official" (2006)
 Kathy Griffin: My Life on the D-List – 2005–2010 TV series
 Season 5, Episode 10, "Kathy Is a Star...Kind Of" (2009)  
 Season 6, Episode 7, "Getting My House in Order" (2010)
 Kathy Griffin: stand up specials – 1996– television and DVDs
 Kathy Griffin: Strong Black Woman (2006)
 The L Word – 2004–2009 TV series
 Season 1, Episode 11, "Looking Back" (2004)
  A Lez in Wonderland – 2006 TV documentary
 Lost Worlds – 2005–2006 TV series
 Season 2, Episode 5, "Secret U.S. Bunkers" (2007)
 Mad Men – 2007– TV series
 Season 2, Episode 11, "The Jet Set" (2008)
 The Mentalist – 2008– TV series
 Season 1, Episode 1, "Pilot" (2008)
 My Super Sweet 16 – 2005–2008 TV series
 Season 6, Episode 2, "Kat" (2007)
 National Open House – 2006– HGTV series
 Season 1, Episode HNOH-105, "Palm Springs, Philadelphia, Asheville" (2006)
 Season 1, Episode HNOH-109, "New York, Missoula, Palm Springs" (2006)
 Season 2, Episode HNOH-204, "Palm Springs, Moorestown, Austin" (2007)
 Season 2, Episode HNOH-208, "Des Moines, Boston, Palm Springs" (2007)
 Newlyweds: Nick and Jessica – 2003–2005 TV series
 Season 2, Episode 13, "Celebrity Issues" (2004)
 Newport Harbor: The Real Orange County – 2007–2008 MTV TV series
 Season 1, Episode 101, "Crush...Interrupted" (2007)
 Notes from the Underbelly – 2007–2008 TV series
 Season 2, Episode 7, "The List" (2008)
 Season 2, Episode 9, "Baby on Board" (aired 2010)
 The O.C. – 2003– TV series
 Season 1, Episode 16, "The Links" (2004)
 Palm Springs Week with Huell Howser – 2003–2011 TV series
 The Parkers – 1999–2003 TV series
 Season 1, Episode 18, "It's a Spring Bling Thing" (2000)
 Private Practice – 2007– TV series
 Season 5, Episode 13, "The Time Has Come" (2012)
 Property Ladder – 2005 TV series
 Season 1, Episode 3, "Desert DIY Disaster" (2005)
 Real Chance of Love – 2008–2009 TV series
 Season 1, Episode 9, "The Parent Trap, Part I" (2008)
 Road Rules – 1995–2007 TV series
 Season 9 (Maximum Velocity Tour), Episode 21, "The Real World/Road Rules Casting Special" (2001)
 Samantha Brown's Great Weekends – 2008– TV series
 Season 3, Episode 5, "Palm Springs" (2010)
 Scott Baio Is 46...and Pregnant
 Season 1, Episode 3, "Commitment" (2008)
 Sell This House – 2003– TV series
 Season 3, Episode 6, "Palm Springs, CA: Michael Trefun & Tom Mendel" (2005)
 Season 5, Episode 24, "Palm Springs, CA: Tim & Andy" (2008)
 Season 5, Episode 25, "Palm Springs, CA: Maria & Joe" (2008)
 SexTV – 1998–2008 TV series
 Season 10, Episode 4, "Desert Shadows/Joe Gallant/A Naked Portrait: The Cowboy" (2007)
 Shootout – 2003–2008 TV series
 Season 4, Episode 11, "Palm Springs Film Festival 2007 part 1" (2007)
 Season 4, Episode 12, "Palm Springs Film Festival 2007 part 2" (2007)
 Season 5, Episode 14, "Palm Springs Film Festival" (2008)
 Sons of Hollywood – 2007 TV series
 Season 1, Episode 5, "Making of a Male Actor" (2007)
 Street Patrol – 2009 TV series
 Season 2, Episode 24, "Palm Springs/Kansas City/Riviera Beach" (2009)
 The Surreal Life – 2003–2006 TV series
 Season 2, Episode 5, "Nude Resort" (2004)
 Totally Spies! – 2001– TV series
 Season 1, Episode 18, "Evil Boyfriend" (2002)
 Trading Spouses – 2004–2007 TV series
 Season 3, Episode 4, "Solomon/Parodi (1)" (2006)
 Season 3, Episode 5, "Solomon/Parodi (2)" (2006)
 Trista & Ryan's Wedding – 2003 ABC miniseries (at The Lodge luxury resort in Rancho Mirage)
 Untold Stories of the E.R. – 2005– TV series
 Season 4, Episode 8, "Too Close to Home" (2006)
 The Wandering Golfer – 2004–2006 TV series
 Season 1, Episode 13, "Palm Springs, California" (2005)
 Welcome to the Parker – 2007 TV series
 Season 1, Episode 1, "Guess Who's Coming to (Criticize) Dinner?" (2007)
 Season 1, Episode 2, "Let Them Eat Tarts" (2007)
 Season 1, Episode 3, "Drag Queens and a Drama Queen" (2007)
 Season 1, Episode 4, "The Business of Pleasure" (2007)
 Season 1, Episode 5, "Making Up is Hard to Do" (2007)
 Season 1, Episode 6, "Last Looks" (2007)
 Work Out – 2006–2008 TV series
 Season 1, Episode 2, Episode 102, (2006)
 Season 1, Episode 4, "Jackie's Away, Trainers Will Play" (2006)
 Season 1, Episode 5, "Inner Strength" (2006)

2010s

 1000 Ways to Die – 2008– TV series
 Season 3, Episode 25, "Death on a Stick" (2010)
 All About Aubrey – 2011 TV series
 Season 1, Episode 4, "Single White Roommate" (2011)
 The Amazing Race – 2001– TV series
 Season 18, Episode 1, "Head Down and Hold On: Australia" (2011)
 America's Next Top Model – 2003– TV series
 Cycle 15, Episode 1, "Welcome to High Fashion" (2010)
 Auction Hunters – 2010– TV series
 Season 3, Episode 13, "Hot Wheels" (2011)
 Audrina – 2011 TV series
 Season 1, Episode 1, "This Is MY Reality" (2011)
 Beverly's Full House – 2011– Oprah Winfrey Network (OWN) TV series
 Chefs vs. City – 2009–2010 TV series
 Season 2, Episode 10, "Palm Springs" (2010)
  Deadly Women – 2005– Discovery Channel series
 Season 6, Episode 20, "Brides of Blood"
 Design School – 2010 HGTV series
 Season 1, Episode HDSCH-109H, "Chase Hotel, Part 1" (2010)
 Season 1, Episode HDSCH-110H, "Chase Hotel, Part 2" (2010)
 Extreme Homes – HGTV series
 "Palm Springs Home" (2012)
 Forever Young – 2013– TV series
 Season 1, Episode 4, "Party in Palm Springs" (2013)
 Hell's Kitchen – 2005– TV series
 Season 9, Episode 9, (July 19, 2011)
 Life After People – 2009–2010 TV series
 Season 2, Episode 6, "Holiday Hell" (2010)
 Martha – 2010– TV series (a.k.a. The Martha Stewart Show)
  "The Palm Springs Show" (May 27, 2010)
 Men of a Certain Age – 2009–2011 TV series
 Season 2, Episode 6, "Let the Sunshine In" (2011)
 Million Dollar Decorators – 2011 Bravo HD TV series
 Season 1, Episode 7, "The Suite Life" (2011) 
 Million Dollar Rooms  – 2011–2012 HGTV series
 Episode HMDRS-203HE, "Nature Filled Great Room" (2012)
 The Next Food Network Star – 2005– TV series
 Season 6, Episode 6, "Retro Palm Springs" (2010)
 Off Limits – 2011– TV series
 Season 2, Episode 7, "Digging for Sea Salt; Demolishing a Bridge; Atop a Tramway" (2012)
 On the Red Carpet – 2013– TV series
 Episode 11, "From the Palm Springs International Film Festival" (2014)
 The Outdoor Room  – HGTV series
 "Mid-Century Outdoors" (2010)
 Pipe Dream – 2010 TV series
 Raising Whitley – 2013– TV series
 Season 1, Episode 6, "Palm Springs Shimmy" (2013)
 The Real Housewives of Atlanta – 2008– TV series
 Season 3, Episode 2, "Model Behavior" (2010)
 Season 3, Episode 3, "White Hot" (2010)
 The Real Housewives of Orange County – 2006– TV series
 Season 5, Episode 13, "Let's Bow Our Heads and Pray" (2010)
 Season 6, Episode 3, "A New Lease On Life" (2011)
 The Real L Word – 2010– TV series
 Season 1, Episode 9, "Dinah Or Bust" (2010)

See also

 List of films shot in Palm Springs, California
 List of films shot in Riverside, California
 List of years in film
 List of years in radio
 List of years in television
 Palm Springs in popular culture

References and notes

 "Old Palm Springs Movies" (2001), California's Gold /#0004. VHS videorecording by Huell Howser Productions, in association with KCET/Los Angeles.

External links
 City of Palm Springs: Film Permits

 
 
Lists of films by setting
Lists of television series by setting
List of films set in Palm Springs
Lists of films and television series